(People of the Valley) is a Welsh-language soap opera produced by the BBC since October 1974. The longest-running television soap opera produced by the BBC,  was originally transmitted on BBC One Wales and later transferred to the Welsh-language station S4C when it opened in November 1982.

The programme typically centres around the residents of  – a fictional, Welsh speaking, agricultural community.

Apart from rugby and football specials,  is consistently one of the most watched programmes of the week on S4C, and in 1994 was briefly shown across the whole of the United Kingdom on BBC Two with English subtitles.

On 25 September 2019, the soap hit a significant broadcasting landmark when it aired its 8,000th episode.

Setting 
Whilst much of the show's early activity took place at a nursing home, storylines are currently centred on the village pub, and its adjacent small businesses and houses. Other frequent settings for storylines include the comprehensive school, and a local farm, .

Originally filmed at Broadcasting House, Cardiff, since 2011 the programme has been filmed at the BBC's drama studios at Roath Lock in Cardiff Bay, other than a few on-location shoots around Cardiff.

Broadcast
Three episodes are produced each week, broadcast at 8pm between Tuesdays and Thursdays, a reduction from a fifth episode in 2019, and a reduction from a fourth episode in 2021. In addition, a weekly omnibus with in-vision English subtitles airs on Sunday evenings.

On 18 March 2020 it was announced that filming would be suspended in the light of the spread of COVID-19 until further notice. The number of episodes being broadcast would be also be reduced to two per week "so that we can ensure the audience can continue to enjoy  in their homes for as long as possible." The episodes were shown on Tuesdays and Thursdays in the usual time slot. In June 2020, it was announced that , would go on a transmission break following the broadcast on 16 June 2020. A behind-the-scenes show, aired in the show's place during the transmission break. Every episode featured an exclusive interview with the show's cast, with 12 episodes being shown. The soap also aired a repeat of "iconic" episodes from the past.

Five months later, it was confirmed that there were plans for a return to production. When production recommenced, social distancing measures were utilised and the cast were required to do their own hair and make-up, which is normally done by a make-up artist. Filming recommenced on 10 August 2020, with new episodes airing twice a week from 8 September 2020, increasing to four in January 2021.

Present characters

Regular characters

Recurring and guest characters

References

External links

BBC Cymru Wales television shows
S4C original programming
Television series by BBC Studios
Welsh television soap operas
Welsh-language television shows
1974 British television series debuts
Television shows set in Wales
Television shows filmed in Wales
1970s British television soap operas
1970s Welsh television series
1980s British television soap operas
1980s Welsh television series
1990s British television soap operas
1990s Welsh television series
2000s British television soap operas
2000s Welsh television series
2010s British television soap operas
2010s Welsh television series
2020s British television soap operas
2020s Welsh television series
Television productions suspended due to the COVID-19 pandemic